Goritsa is a hill and an archaeological site in Volos, Greece, immediately east of the city centre. It was examined in the early 1970s by a Dutch team of archaeologists, revealing a planned ancient city with a regular street grid covering most of the hill.

References

Former populated places in Greece
Populated places in ancient Thessaly
Thessalian city-states
Cities in ancient Greece
Archaeological sites in Greece
Archaeological sites in Thessaly
Ancient Greek archaeological sites in Thessaly